The 1984 New Hampshire gubernatorial election took place on November 6, 1984. Incumbent Governor John Sununu was re-elected to a second term in office.

Election results

References

See also

New Hampshire
1984
Gubernatorial